Alessandro Burlamaqui Apaolaza (born 18 February 2002) is a Peruvian footballer who plays as a midfielder for Spanish club CD Badajoz, on loan from Valencia CF.

Club career

Early career
Burlamaqui was born in Lima, Peru, to a Brazilian father and Peruvian mother, but moved to Spain as a one year old. After settling in Spain, Burlamaqui joined his first professional football team at the age of seven, when he signed for Gimnàstic Tarragona. He also played for the youth sides of CE Santes Creus and Reus Deportiu, before joining Espanyol in 2015.

He rose quickly through the youth ranks of Espanyol to become captain of both Juvenil A & B Teams side. In October 2019, he was named among the 60 best young talents in the world by English newspaper The Guardian.

Valencia
In July 2021, Burlamaqui signed for fellow Spanish side Valencia on a three-year deal. He played for the reserve team, helping in their promotion to Segunda División RFEF.

On 19 July 2022, Burlamaqui was loaned to Primera Federación side CD Badajoz for the season.

International career
Burlamaqui is eligible to represent Peru, his birthplace, Brazil through his father, and Spain for his Spanish-Basque ancestry from his mother's family side. He has represented Peru at both under-17 and under-20 level. He has committed his international future to Peru.

References

External links

 
 
 

 

2002 births
Living people
Footballers from Lima
Peruvian footballers
Peru youth international footballers
Spanish footballers
Peruvian people of Brazilian descent
Peruvian people of Spanish descent
Association football midfielders
Tercera Federación players
Valencia CF Mestalla footballers
CD Badajoz players